Asteroma coryli is a species of fungus in the family  plant pathogen that causes leaf spot on hazelnut.

References

Diaporthales
Fungal tree pathogens and diseases
Fungi described in 1870
Nut tree diseases